Peng or Dapeng is a giant bird that transforms from a Kun giant fish in Chinese mythology.

Names
The Chinese logograms for peng and kun are radical-phonetic characters. Peng 鵬 combines the bird radical 鳥 with the phonetic peng 朋 (friend; to band together). Kun combines the fish radical 魚 with the phonetic kun 昆 (progeny; insect).

In the opening story of the Zhuangzi, Peng is the name of a large bird with a back countless thousands of miles across, and Kun is the name of a large fish countless thousands of miles in length. These names are ironic. The dictionary meaning of Kun is fish roe. (The irony is that this fish is a speck of roe, and yet is countless thousands of miles in size.) The meaning of Peng has to be inferred. The peng 朋 component of the logogram gives the meaning that this bird is a friend, or is one of a group. (The irony is that this bird is one of a group, and yet is countless thousands of miles in size.) Tricker translates Kun as Speck of Roe, and Peng as Of a Flock.

Peng (鵬) was a variant Chinese character for feng (鳳) in fenghuang (鳳凰 "Chinese phoenix" ca. 100 CE Shuowen Jiezi).

Synonyms of Peng include Dapeng (大鵬 "Big Peng", "Great Peng") and Dapengniao (大鵬鳥 "Great Peng Bird"). Dapeng is also a place name for a few places in greater China, most notably in Shenzhen and Taiwan.

After recent fossil discoveries in northeast China, Chinese paleontologists used Peng to name the enantiornithine bird Pengornis and the wukongopterid pterosaur Kunpengopterus.

Literature

Zhuangzi 
In Chinese literature, the Daoist classic Zhuangzi has the oldest record of the Kun Peng myth. The first chapter ("Free and Easy Wandering" 逍遙遊 pinyin xiāoyáoyóu) begins with three versions of this parable; the lead paragraph, a quote from the Qixie (齊諧 "Universal Harmony", probably invented by Zhuangzi), and a quote from the Tang zhi wen Ji (湯之問棘 "Questions of Tang to Ji", cf. Liezi chapter 5, Tang wen 湯問). The first account contrasts the giant Peng bird with a small tiao (蜩 "cicada") and jiu (鳩 "pigeon; turtledove") and the third with a yan (鴳 or 鷃 "quail"). The Peng fish-bird transformation is not only the beginning myth in Zhuangzi, but Robert Allinson claims, "the central myth".
{{blockquote|In the northern darkness there is a fish and his name is K'un. The K'un is so huge I don't know how many thousand li he measures. He changes and becomes a bird whose name is P'eng. The back of the P'eng measures I don't know how many thousand li across and, when he rises up and flies off, his wings are like clouds all over the sky. When the sea begins to move, this bird sets off for the southern darkness, which is the Lake of Heaven.

The Universal Harmony records various wonders, and it says: "When the P'eng journeys to the southern darkness, the waters are roiled for three thousand li. He beats the whirlwind and rises ninety thousand li, setting off on the sixth month gale." Wavering heat, bits of dust, living things blowing each other about – the sky looks very blue. Is that its real color, or is it because it is so far away and has no end? When the bird looks down, all he sees is blue too.

If water is not piled up deep enough, it won't have the strength to bear up a big boat. Pour a cup of water into a hollow in the floor and bits of trash will sail on it like boats. But set the cup there and it will stick fast, for the water is too shallow and the boat too large. If wind is not piled up deep enough, it won't have the strength to bear up great wings. Therefore when the P'eng rises ninety thousand li, he must have the wind under him like that. Only then can he mount on the back of the wind, shoulder the blue sky, and nothing can hinder or block him. Only then can he set his eyes to the south.

The cicada and the little dove laugh at this saying, "When we make an effort and fly up, we can get as far as the elm or the sapanwood tree, but sometimes we don't make it and just fall down on the ground. Now how is anyone going to go ninety thousand li to the south!If you go off to the green woods nearby, you can take along food for three meals and come back with your stomach as full as ever. If you are going a hundred li, you must grind your grain the night before; and if you are going a thousand li you must start getting together provisions three months in advance. What do these two creatures understand? Little understanding cannot come up to great understanding; the short-lived cannot come up to the long-lived. ...

Among the questions of T'ang to Ch'i we find the same thing. In the bald and barren north, there is a dark sea, the Lake of Heaven. In it is a fish which is several thousand li across, and no one knows how long. His name is K'un. There is also a bird there, named P'eng, with a back like Mount T'ai and wings like clouds filling the sky. He beats the whirlwind, leaps into the air, and rises up ninety thousand li, cutting through the clouds and mist, shouldering the blue sky, and then he turns his eyes south and prepares to journey to the southern darkness.

The little quail laughs at him, saying, "Where does he think he's going? I give a great leap and fly up, but I never get more than ten or twelve yards before I come down fluttering among the weeds and brambles. And that's the best kind of flying anyway! Where does he think he's going?" Such is the difference between big and little.}}

 Analysis and interpretations 
Many Zhuangzi scholars have debated the Peng story. Lian Xinda calls it "arguably the most controversial image in the text, which has been inviting conflicting interpretations for the past seventeen centuries."

The earliest known interpretation is the "equality theory" of Guo Xiang (d. 312 CE), who redacted and annotated the received Zhuangzi text. Guo's commentary said,

Guo's equality theory, however, was immediately rejected by some scholars. The Buddhist monk Zhi Dun (314-366 CE) associated the Peng's flight with the highest satisfaction achieved by the zhiren (至人 "perfect person; sage; saint", cf. zhenren). The Chan Buddhist master Hanshan Deqing (憨山德清, 1546–1623) also declares the Peng is the image of the Daoist sage, and suggests the bird's flight does not result from the piling up of wind but from the deep piling up of de "virtue; power".

In modern scholarship, this debate over the equality interpretation continues. Lian differentiates contemporary interpretations between whether Zhuangzi was a radical skeptic and/or a relativist:

Most modern scholars, however, reject Guo's equality interpretation. Julian Pas argues that "the true sage is compared to the enormous bird." Angus Charles Graham sees the Peng as "soaring above the restricted viewpoints of the worldly." Allinson finds it "very clear and very explicit that the standpoint of the big bird and the standpoint of the cicada and the dove are not seen as possessing equal value." Karen Carr and Philip J. Ivanhoe find "positive ideals" in the Peng symbolizing the "mythical creature that rises above the more mundane concerns of the word. Brian Lundberg says Zhuangzi uses the image to urge us to "go beyond restricted small points of views." Eric Schwitzgebel interprets, "Being small creatures, we cannot understand great things like the Peng (and the rest of the Zhuangzi?)." Steve Coutinho describes the Peng as a "recluse who wanders beyond the realm of the recognizable", in contrast the tiny birds that "cannot begin to understand what lies so utterly beyond the confines of their mundane experience." Scott Cook writes, "We are, at first, led by Zhuangzi almost imperceptibly into an unreflective infatuation with the bird."<ref>Scott Cook (2003), Harmony and Cacophony in the Panpipes of Heaven," in Hiding the World in the World; Uneven Discourses on the Zhuangzi, SUNY Press, 70.</ref> Lian concludes the Peng is "An inspiring example of soaring up and going beyond, the image is used to broaden the outlook of the small mind; its function is thus more therapeutic than instructional." Bryan W. Van Norden suggests, "The likely effect of this passage on the reader is a combination of awe and disorientation." Christopher Tricker argues that Peng (Of a Flock) represents one's field of consciousness: "Like Of a Flock, whose wings arc across the heavens, the wings of your consciousness span to the horizon." On Tricker's interpretation, Peng (Of a Flock; your here-and-now field of consciousness) is "large" and each of the various things that you are aware of is "small"; Peng (your here-and-now field of consciousness) is always present, whereas things come and go. 

Zhuangzi's Peng bird became a famous literary metaphor. Two early examples were the Shen yi jing (神異經 "Classic of Divine Marvels") by Dongfang Shuo (154 BCE – 93 CE) and the Commentary on the Water Classic (水經注).

Comparisons 
In comparative mythology of giant creatures, Peng is similar to the Roc or Garuda and Kun to the Leviathan.

Notable people named Peng (鵬/鹏)
Peng linguistically symbolizes "greatness; great promise; great accomplishments"; for instance, the idiom péng chéng wàn lǐ (鵬程萬里, literally, the Peng journeys 10,000 li) means "have a bright/unlimited future". This character is commonly used in Chinese given names and several important mainland Chinese, Hong Kong and Taiwanese politicians have Peng in their given names. In contrast, the character Kun (鯤/鲲) is seldom used.

Mainland China:

Yue Fei (courtesy name: Pengju, 鵬舉), Chinese military general, calligrapher, and poet during the Southern Song dynasty
Li Peng (李鵬), former Premier of China
Ji Pengfei (姬鵬飛), Chinese politician
Xiao Peng (肖鵬)
Bi Dapeng (毕大鹏)
Peng Kiong Chou
Lin Peng (林鹏), Chinese actress
Dong Chengpeng (董成鹏), professionally known as Da Peng (大鹏), Chinese actor, film director and singer
Yue Yunpeng (岳云鹏), Chinese actor and xiangsheng performer
Jing Haipeng (景海鹏), Chinese astronaut
Ouyang Kunpeng (欧阳鲲鹏), Chinese swimmer (note Kun is also used in this case)
Hong Kong:
Stanley Kwan Kam-pang (關錦鵬), Hong Kong film director and producer
Ruco Chan Chin-pang (陳展鵬), Hong Kong actor and singer
Lo Hoi-pang (盧海鵬), Hong Kong actor and singer
Lam Tung Pang (林東鵬), Hong Kong artist
Taiwan:
Yeh Yao-peng (葉耀鵬), Taiwanese politician
Cheng Yun-peng (鄭運鵬), Taiwanese politician
Hsieh Cheng-peng (謝政鵬), Taiwanese tennis player
Southeast Asia:
Alex Au Waipang (区伟鹏), Singaporean LGBT rights activist
Goh Choon Phong (吴俊鹏), Singaporean businessman and CEO of Singapore Airlines
Prajogo Pangestu (彭雲鵬), Indonesian business magnate of Chinese descent
Japan:

The Chinese character peng is pronounced hō in Japanese, as seen in the sumo ring names Taihō Kōki (大鵬幸喜), Hakuhō Shō (白鵬翔), Enhō Akira (炎鵬晃), Daishōhō Kiyohiro (大翔鵬 清洋), Tokushinhō Motohisa (德真鵬 元久), Wakanohō Toshinori (若ノ鵬 寿則), Kyokutenhō Masaru (旭天鵬 勝) and so on. It is also used in company names, such as Taiho Pharmaceutical (大鵬薬品工業).

See also
 Birds in Chinese mythology
 Fenghuang
 Fish in Chinese mythology
 Golden Winged Great Peng

References

Mythological and legendary Chinese birds
Roc (mythology)